Charlotte Britz (born 27 February 1958) is a former German politician who served as Mayor of Saarbrücken from 2004 until 2019.

Politics 
Charlotte Britz joined the Social Democratic Party (SPD) at the age of 16. She was first elected to the Saarbrücken City Council in 1989 and was re-elected in 1994. In 1996, she was elected Head of the City Social Department and subsequently resigned from her seat in the city council.

Britz ran for the position as mayor of Saarbrücken in 2004 and defeated the Christian Democratic candidate Josef Hecken in the runoff. In 2011, she was re-elected with an overall majority in the first ballot, avoiding a runoff. Ahead of the Saarland state election in 2017, she was considered a potential Social Democratic candidate for Minister-President of Saarland, but chose not to run. Britz was nominated for the World Mayor Prize in 2018.

She sought a third term in the 2019 local elections and received the most votes in the first ballot on 26 May. In the runoff on 9 June, the Christian Democratic candidate Uwe Conradt defeated her narrowly by 0.6 percent, ending a 43 year long streak of Social Democratic mayors in Saarbrücken. Her term as mayor expired on 30 September 2019.

References 

1958 births
Political office-holders in Saarland
Living people
Social Democratic Party of Germany politicians
20th-century German women politicians
21st-century German women politicians
People from Neunkirchen, Saarland